Acquaviva Platani (Sicilian: Acquaviva Plàtani) is a hill town and comune in the province of Caltanissetta.

The name of the town (meaning "Living Water" in Italian) is derived from the numerous natural springs in the area. Until 1862, the town was called simply Acquaviva; the appositive Platani was added to distinguish it from the other three Italian towns named Acquaviva. Platani is the name of the river which flows nearby.

The economy is based on agriculture: the production of wheat, olives, almonds, and pistachios are important. Also, cattle and horse breeding, along with sheep farms provide income.

Sights include the Torre dell'Orologio (clock tower) which was built in 1894, and the 17th century Chiesa Madre (Mother Church), dedicated to Santa Maria della Luce.

Salvatore Quasimodo, who spent part of his childhood at Acquaviva Platani, writes about the town in his poem "Che vuoi pastore d'aria?", which was included in the Nuove Poesie collection

References

Municipalities of the Province of Caltanissetta